Tellingstedt is a municipality in the district of Dithmarschen, in Schleswig-Holstein, Germany. It is situated approximately 13 km east of Heide.

Tellingstedt is part of the Amt Kirchspielslandgemeinde ("collective municipality") Eider.

References

Dithmarschen